The Friendship Heights–Southeast Line, designated as Routes 30N or 30S, were daily bus routes operated by the Washington Metropolitan Area Transit Authority between Friendship Heights station of the Red Line of the Washington Metro and Naylor Road station or Southern Avenue station of the Green Line of the Washington Metro. Both lines operated every 60 minutes at all times. Trips were roughly 90 minutes long. This line provided service from Friendship Heights, operating through most of NW and SE DC and ending in Southern Prince Georges County via a one bus ride. Extra services are provided by the 32, 34, and 36 in Southeast and 31 and 33 in Northwest. Service was eliminated on September 5, 2021 due to redundancy.

Route

Routes 30N and 30S operated every 60 minutes daily. Additional service wass provided by the 31, 32, 33, 34, and 36 in both Southeast and Northwest. Routes 30N and 30S wass a combination of routes 31, 32, 33, 34, 36, 37, and 39 that forms one long route as Routes 31, 33, and 37 run the portion between Friendship Heights station and Potomac Park or Federal Triangle via Wisconsin Avenue and Routes 32, 34, 36, and 39 run from Potomac Park or Archives station to Southern Avenue station or Naylor Road station via Pennsylvania Avenue. It was the 32 and 36 routing pre August 2014.

Routes 30N and 30S got their buses out of Andrews Federal Center division. Prior to June 23, 2019, 30N and 30S would get their buses out of Western division.

Route 30N stops

Route 30S stops

History

The 30s lines has been one of the most popular bus lines in WMATA. It is one of the oldest operating Washington routes having it incorporated from streetcar lines and the Washington and Georgetown Railroad in the 1860s and ran by buses beginning in 1936. As of 2008, the 30s line has more than 20,000 passengers a day riding the buses.

Prior to the 30N, and 30S being introduced, the line was operated by the Pennsylvania Avenue Line as Routes 32 and 36 with select trips terminating at Farragut Square or Foggy Bottom–GWU station. Prior to June 29, 2008, the line was served by the 30, 32, 34, 35, and 36 lines. Routes 34, 35, and 36 will terminate at Naylor Road station, 32 will terminate at Southern Avenue station, while Route 30 will terminate at Potomac Avenue station. In 2008, WMATA launched a study on the Pennsylvania Avenue line to improve services and to reduce delays and bus bunchings.

On June 29, 2008, WMATA announced the discontinuation of the 30, 34, and 35, and the introduction of the M5, 31, 37, and 39. Under the new changes, Routes 32 and 36 will remain the same while the 31 adds additional service between Friendship Heights station and Foggy Bottom and the M5 adds additional service between Eastern Market station and Naylor Road station. Routes 37 and 39 are new MetroExtra Routes operating the same as Routes 31 (37) and M5 (39) but operating selected stops. The M5 would later be renamed the 34 when it was extended to Archives station on December 28, 2008.

In 2013, WMATA announced proposals to simplify the busy Pennsylvania Avenue Line and Naylor Road Line. Under the proposals, Routes 32 and 36 will terminate at Foggy Bottom with a new 30s line to replace portions of the 32, and 36, and discontinue the 34 with four options to replace the 32 and 36. According to WMATA, it proposes the following:
 Option 1: Same as Route 32 between Southern Avenue and Potomac Avenue Station SE, then west to Georgetown via Lincoln Park, Union Station, and Thomas Circle, and then follow Route 31 between Georgetown and Friendship Heights.
 Option 2: Same as Route 32 between Southern Avenue and Eastern Market, then west to Georgetown via 8th Street, Massachusetts Avenue, Union Station, and Thomas Circle, and then follow Route 31 between Georgetown and Friendship Heights.
 Option 3: Same as Route 32 between Southern Avenue and Independence Ave & 7th St SW, then west to Foggy Bottom via Independence Ave, 17th St SW, Virginia Ave, and Washington Circle, and then follow Route 31 to Friendship Heights.
 Option 4: Same as Route 32 between Southern Avenue and Anacostia Freeway SE, then west to Foggy Bottom via Anacostia Freeway, Southeast/Southwest Freeway, Maine Avenue, 17th St SW, Virginia Ave, and Washington Circle, and then follow Route 31 to Friendship Heights.

On August 24, 2014, Routes 30N and 30S were introduced to replace the 32 and 36. Route 30N will operate between Friendship Heights station and Naylor Road station replacing the 36 while the 30S will operate between Friendship Heights and Southern Avenue station replacing the 32. Additionally, a new Route 33 was introduced to operate alongside the 31 between Friendship Heights and Federal Triangle station replacing the discontinued portions of the 32 and 36 and adding additional service to the 30N and 30S as both routes will operate hourly services. Routes 32 and 36 were shorten to terminate at Foggy Bottom–GWU station/Potomac Park at Virginia Avenue & E Street NW. It also merged the ″Naylor Road Line″ (Route 34) to operate as a single line. These changes were made due to overcrowding, bus bunching, simplifying the 30s lines, and to improve on time performances.

The 30N and 30S are reincarnations of the former 30 and 35 routes but have the same routing as the 32 and 36 and operating as a separate line combining Routes 31, 32, 33, 34, and 36 all into a single route.

Beginning on December 15, 2019, routes 30N and 30S along with routes 32, 34, 36, and 39 were rerouted to travel across the National Mall along 4th Street between Pennsylvania Avenue NW and Independence Avenue SW towards Archives, Friendship Heights and Potomac Park instead of 7th Street to provide a more direct service to the route.

During the COVID-19 pandemic, routes 30N and 30S operated on their weekend schedule during the weekdays beginning on March 16, 2020. On March 21, 2020, the line was improved to operate every 30 minutes with 15 minutes in between buses due to the weekend suspension of routes 31, 32, 33, and 36. On August 23, 2020, routes 30N and 30S restored its weekday schedule but its weekend service was suspended being replaced by routes 32, 33, and 36.

During WMATAs 2021 fiscal year budget, it was proposed for both the 30N and 30S to be fully eliminated and to be replaced by routes 31, 32, 33, 36, and 39 order to improve on-time performance and simplify the 30s line. However WMATA later backed out the elimination on April 2, 2020. The same proposal was brought back up in February 2021.

On September 5, 2021, all Route 30N and 30S service were discontinued and replaced by Routes 31, 32, 33, and 36 which improved their frequencies to every 12 minutes daily.

References

External links
 Metrobus
 The Metrobus 30s Line Study, sponsored by the Washington Metropolitan Area Transit Authority in conjunction with the District of Columbia Department of Transportation

Street railways in Washington, D.C.
30N
1862 establishments in Washington, D.C.